Ian Campbell Templeton  (born 24 March 1929) is a veteran New Zealand political reporter who celebrated 50 years of reporting the New Zealand Parliament from the press gallery in 2007. He has written several books on politics. He was the only print journalist to get a weekly one-on-one briefing with Prime Minister Helen Clark.

He was educated at King's High School, Dunedin, and completed an economics degree at the University of Otago. After university he was a general reporter for two years at the Otago Daily Times.

His twin brother Hugh was a former diplomat, public servant and politician, and their brother Malcolm is a diplomat, public servant and author.

Templeton was appointed an Officer of the Order of the British Empire in the 1994 New Year Honours, and a Companion of the New Zealand Order of Merit in the 2010 New Year Honours, both for services to journalism.

In May 2011 he was conferred an honorary doctorate by Massey University.

References

1929 births
Companions of the New Zealand Order of Merit
Living people
New Zealand journalists
New Zealand Officers of the Order of the British Empire
University of Otago alumni
People educated at King's High School, Dunedin